Talent for the Game is a 1991 film directed by Robert M. Young and starring Edward James Olmos, Lorraine Bracco, Terry Kinney, Jamey Sheridan, and Jeff Corbett. The plot concerns a baseball scout.

Scenes were filmed on the Palouse in the small town of Genesee, Idaho, between Lewiston and Moscow, and nearby Garfield, Washington. Other scenes were shot in northern Idaho at Kellogg.

After a disappointing debut in a limited number of theaters in Florida, it went quickly to video.

Plot summary
Virgil Sweet (Olmos) is a veteran baseball scout for the California Angels. He is in danger of losing his life's work because the Angels' new owner, Gil Lawrence (Kinney), is unhappy with the farm system and threatening to eliminate the team's scouts.

Virgil hasn't discovered a great young prospect for quite a while. One day, when the car that he and girlfriend Bobbie (Bracco), who also is employed by the team, are driving breaks down on a rural road, Virgil happens upon a country boy named Sammy Bodeen (Corbett) who has a pitching arm worthy of the major leagues.

Greeted back in Anaheim with considerable skepticism, Virgil arranges a tryout for Sammy. The boy is wild at first and Virgil's great find appears to be a big joke. Once he calms down, however, Sammy proves to have everything it takes to make it big.

Team management, desperate for a new star, immediately begins to overplay the arrival of Sammy with wildly overblown hype. A public-relations blitz promotes the boy as baseball's next great star, even though he has yet to throw a pitch in a big-league game. By the time Sammy takes the mound for his first Angels game, expectations are so high that he cannot possibly live up to them.

He is roughed up by opponents in the first inning, humiliating the owner and making fans furious. But, gradually, with a surprise assist from Virgil on the field, Sammy settles down and begins to look like a star in the making.

Cast

References

External links
 
 

1991 films
1990s sports films
American baseball films
California Angels
Films shot in Idaho
Films shot in Washington (state)
Films set in Idaho
Films directed by Robert M. Young
Films with screenplays by Larry Ferguson
Films scored by David Newman
1990s English-language films
1990s American films